The College of Paramedics of Nova Scotia (CPNS) is the regulatory college for medical paramedic in Nova Scotia, Canada.

The college issues certificates of registration for all paramedics to allow them to practise medicine as well as: monitors and maintains standards of practice via assessment and remediation, investigates complaints against paramedics, and disciplines those found guilty of professional misconduct and/or incompetence.

The CPNS's power is derived from Paramedics Act and the Medicine Act. The college is based in Halifax.

Committee structure

 Registration Committee & Mandate
 Registration Appeal Committee & Mandate
 Investigation Committee & Mandate
 Hearing Committee & Mandate

Council of the College of Paramedics
Government has appointed members of the initial Council of the College of Paramedics of Nova Scotia.
 Dr. Andrew Travers, Provincial Medical Director; 
 Donna Denney, College of Registered Nurses of Nova Scotia;
 Dr. Elizabeth Mann, College of Physicians and Surgeons of Nova Scotia
 Bud Avery, Manager, Paramedic Regulatory Affairs, Emergency Health Services

Professional staff
 Karl Kowalczyk, Registrar / Executive Director
 Krista Mosher- Administrative Assistant

Paramedic members
 Steven Menzies, Berwick, three-year term
 Jonathan M. Akin, Kentville, two-year term
 Bruce Sangster, Amherst, two-year term
 Tanya Snow, Mulgrave, three-year term
 Ryan Brown, Sydney, three-year term
 Paul Landriault, Port Hawkesbury, two-year term
 David Kent Matherson, Halifax, two-year term

Public members
 Douglas Lloy, Stellarton, three-year term
 Guy James Williams, Dartmouth, three-year term.
 Louis Staple, Dartmouth, two-year term

Criticisms associated with the college

References

Medical associations based in Canada
Medical and health organizations based in Nova Scotia
Professional associations based in Nova Scotia
Nova Scotia